Poniklá is a municipality and village in Semily District in the Liberec Region of the Czech Republic. It has about 1,100 inhabitants.

Economy
Poniklá is known for the handmade production of Christmas decorations from blown glass beads. The tradition dates back to the end of the 19th century. Since 2020, the production has been included in the UNESCO Intangible Cultural Heritage Lists.

References

Villages in Semily District